Wadi Al Wasaah is a village in the municipality of Al Daayen in Qatar. It is bordered by the Umm Salal Municipality to west, Rawdat Al Hamama to the east and Al Sakhama to the north.

Etymology
Named after a prominent geographic feature, "wadi" is an Arabic term reserved for dry river valleys. The second part of its name, "wasaah", is an Arabic term for "wide". It was given this name due to the vast expanse of a prominent wadi which traverses the area, extending from Umm Salal to Al Khubaiba.

References 

Populated places in Al Daayen